MKFC may refer to:

Mdina Knights F.C.
Melbourne Knights FC
Mitra Kukar F.C.
MKFC Stockhkolm College

See also
Milton Keynes Dons F.C.